Ia Ora te Nuna'a is an autonomist political party in French Polynesia. The party was founded in December 2022 by Teva Rohfritsch and Nicole Bouteau.

The party was formed after Rohfritsch and Bouteau resigned from the ruling Tāpura Huiraʻatira citing dissatisfaction with the government of Edouard Fritch. It was officially launched on 8 December 2022. Rohfritsch and Bouteau were joined by Teura Tarahu-Atuahiva in the Assembly, as well as by former Assembly President Marcel Tuihani. The objectives of the party are autonomy (as opposed to independence) for French Polynesia, social justice, protection of the environment, and decentralisation. The party intends to contest the 2023 elections.

In January 2023 Marcel Tuihani quit the party, saying that it was not organised enough to contest the election.

References

Political parties in French Polynesia
2022 establishments in French Polynesia
Political parties established in 2022